Ornithuroscincus viridis is a species of skink. It is endemic to the Owen Stanley Range in the Central Province, southeastern Papua New Guinea. Common name green smooth-eared skink has been coined for it.

Adults measure  in snout–vent length. They have short limbs.

References

Ornithuroscincus
Skinks of New Guinea
Reptiles of Papua New Guinea
Endemic fauna of Papua New Guinea
Reptiles described in 2021
Taxa named by Allen Allison
Taxa named by Salvador Carranza
Taxa named by Edward Frederick Kraus